The 1996 CONCACAF Champions' Cup was the 32nd edition of the annual international club football competition held in the CONCACAF region (North America, Central America and the Caribbean), the CONCACAF Champions' Cup. It determined that year's club champion of association football in the CONCACAF region and was played from 9 March 1996 through 20 July 1997.

The teams were split into 2 zones (North/ Central and Caribbean). The North/Central zone was split into 3 groups, qualifying each winner to the final tournament. The winner of the Caribbean zone, earned a place in a playoff against the U.S. representative for a spot in the final tournament. All qualifying matches in the tournament were played under the home/away match system, while the final tournament was played in Guatemala City.

That final stage composed of four teams which played each other in a single round-robin tournament. Mexican team Cruz Azul won their fourth CONCACAF trophy, after finishing 1st. in the final table with 7 points over 3 matches played.

North/Central American Zone

Group 1
First Round
Cruz Azul on bye to the Third round.

 Alajuelense won 6–3 on aggregated.

 Árabe Unido won 2–1 on aggregated.

 Victoria won 7–3 on aggregated.

Second Round
Alajuelense on bye to the Fourth round.

 Victoria won 3–2 on aggregated.

Third Round

 Cruz Azul won 2–1 on aggregated.

Fourth Round

 Cruz Azul won 5–2 on aggregated.

Group 2
First Round
 Necaxa on bye to second round.

Second Round

 Necaxa advanced to the CONCACAF Final Group stage.

Group 3
First Round

|}
 Juventus F.C. on bye, to the second round.

Second Round

|}
 Juventus F.C. on bye, to the third round.

Third Round

|}
CSD Comunicaciones advance to the Final Group stage.

Caribbean Zone

First round

|}
US Sinnamary withdrew after 1st leg*
Red Star withdrew before 1st leg**

Second round

|}
SV Transvaal advance to the USA/Caribbean playoff.

U.S./Caribbean Playoff

|}
Seattle Sounders advance to the Final Group stage.

Final Group stage
Final stage was played in Guatemala City, Guatemala. July 15–20, 1997.

Matches 
All the games played in Guatemala City:

Champion

References

CONCACAF Champions' Cup
1